Sabirkənd may refer to:
 Sabirkənd, Nakhchivan, Azerbaijan
 Sabirkənd, Shamkir, Azerbaijan